Peary Bay is an Arctic waterway in Qikiqtaaluk Region, Nunavut, Canada. It is located in Nares Strait by eastern Ellesmere Island between the Cook Peninsula and the Bache Peninsula.

It was named in honor of the American explorer Robert Peary by Norwegian oceanographer and meteorologist Harald Sverdrup.

References

 Peary Bay, Nunavut at Atlas of Canada

Bays of Qikiqtaaluk Region
Ellesmere Island